Peter Hinton  is a British archaeologist and the current Chief Executive of the Chartered Institute for Archaeologists. Before working for the IfA he worked for the Museum of London Archaeology Service originally as a volunteer field archaeologist and eventually specialising as a post excavation manager. He started working for the IfA in 1997 after being actively involved since 1987. He was elected a Fellow of the Society of Antiquaries on 10 October 2003, he is also a Fellow of the Society of Antiquaries of Scotland.

Notes

British archaeologists
Living people
Year of birth missing (living people)